Bayn Johnson (born November 4, 1958) is a former American actress, electric guitarist and singer. She may be best known as Kelly, the female blonde-haired band/group member of the Short Circus in seasons 3-4 of the PBS children's television series The Electric Company from 1973 to 1975 when she was 14–16 years old. She is an actress in the 1970s.

Early career
Johnson got her first career break in the late 1960s appearing opposite Bernadette Peters as the title character in the off-Broadway musical Curley McDimple, a pseudo-satirical tribute to Shirley Temple movies. She recorded a Christmas novelty song entitled "Christmas Teddy Bear". On December 18, 1967, and January 8, 1968, she appeared on The Merv Griffin Show. In 1969, she appeared as "Happy Hollywood" in the television show, What's It All About, World? and season 2, episode 12: Little Darling of Sierras (December 30, 1969) of Lancer as Penelope "Penny" Rose, and Johnson cameo appeared on the children's television series Sesame Street from 1969 to 1970 when she was 10–11 years old.

The Short Circus
In 1973, 14-year-old Johnson became a member of the Short Circus on the PBS television show The Electric Company. As Kelly, Johnson replaced the recently departed Denise Nickerson, ultimately appearing in 260 episodes of the show. Johnson departed the show in 1975 and was replaced by Janina Matthews.

Later career
After outgrowing The Electric Company in 1975, Johnson made television appearances on The Love Boat in 1977, Police Woman and Switch in 1978.

She left the acting business at 1978 and attended New York University and earned a degree in journalism. As of 2009, she is doing commercial voice-over work.

External links
 
 
 Johnson appearing as Curley McDimple, March 1, 1969

References

Living people
1958 births
20th-century American actresses
American child actresses
American musical theatre actresses
American stage actresses
American television actresses
American voice actresses
American women singers
Actresses from New Orleans
American female dancers
Dancers from Louisiana
21st-century American women